Nicholas Lindsay (born September 3, 1992) is a Canadian soccer player who began his career at the academy level with TFC Academy in the Canadian Soccer League (CSL) in 2009. He successfully made the transition to the professional level in 2010 after securing a contract with Toronto FC in the Major League Soccer (MLS). After a three tenure in the MLS he returned to the CSL in 2013, where he won a CSL Championship in 2015.

Career

Youth
Lindsay has played for Brampton Blast and Brampton East. He was also a member of the Ontario provincial team.

Professional
Lindsay appeared as a substitute for Toronto FC first team in the 2010 Nutrilite Canadian Championship against the Vancouver Whitecaps and an international friendly against Bolton Wanderers. He scored a hat-trick for the Academy team against Chilean Colo-Colo during a friendly between them on June 29, 2010 which finished 4–4.

He signed with Toronto FC on September 15, 2010 becoming the second TFC Academy player to sign for the first team. Lindsay made his first-team debut on September 15, 2010 vs. Real Salt Lake as a 2nd half sub in CONCACAF Champions League play. A week later on September 22, 2010 Lindsay earned his first start versus the Mexican superpower Cruz Azul in a game which finished 0-0 at the Estadio Azul which was also in the Champions League. He made his MLS debut on October 2, 2010 against Seattle Sounders FC, coming on in the 61st minute at Qwest Field and setting up Chad Barrett for Toronto FC's second goal in a 3–2 loss. Lindsay made his first MLS start on October 16 and collected his second assist in just his third match, a 2–2 draw with Columbus on October 16. In his fourth MLS game he collected his third assist against D.C. United.

Lindsay missed the entire 2011 season due to a knee injury.

Lindsay's option was declined following the 2012 season. He then signed with Burlington SC of the CSL for the 2013 season. He recorded the club's first historic goal in a match against Kingston FC. He finished as the club's top goalscorer with 11 goals. In 2015, he signed with league giants Toronto Croatia. During his tenure with Croatia the club finished as runners-up, and captured the CSL Championship by defeating SC Waterloo Region. Following Toronto's departure from the CSL, Lindsay signed with York Region Shooters on May 26, 2016.

International 

Lindsay represented Canada in the Danone Nations Cup in 2004.

Honours

Toronto FC
Canadian Championship: (3) 2010, 2011, 2012

Toronto Croatia
CSL Championship: 2015

Club Statistics

References

External links
 

1992 births
Living people
Association football forwards
Black Canadian soccer players
Canadian Soccer League (1998–present) players
Canadian soccer players
Soccer players from Toronto
Sportspeople from Etobicoke
Toronto FC players
Major League Soccer players
Canada men's youth international soccer players
Toronto Croatia players
York Region Shooters players
Halton United players
Homegrown Players (MLS)